Adrian Marren is a Gaelic footballer from Ireland. Marren plays for the Curry club and previously for the Sligo county team.

Marren was part of the Sligo team that won the Connacht title in 2007.	

He was also man-of-the-match in a 2012 Connacht Senior Football Championship victory over Galway in which he scored 2–6.

In October 2020, Marren announced his retirement from inter-county football after 16 years.

Honours
Connacht Senior Football Championship (1): 2007

References

Year of birth missing (living people)
Living people
Curry Gaelic footballers
Gaelic football forwards
Sligo inter-county Gaelic footballers